The Battle of Goa refers to a series of naval engagements between the Portuguese Armada and the Dutch East India Company fleets attempting to blockade and conquer the city of Goa. In 1638, forces commanded by the Viceroy of Portuguese India, D. Pedro da Silva and later António Teles de Meneses, fought off a large Dutch fleet sent to block the port colony of Goa, commanded by Admiral Adam Westerwolt, who was badly defeated at this encounter. The next year 1639, the Dutch Admiral Cornelis Simonsz van der Veere would conduct a new raid on Goa's port.

References

Colonial Goa
Goa 1638
Goa 1638
1638 in Portuguese India
Goa 1638
Goa 1638
Goa
1638 in Asia